Sathiyamangalam is a village in the Papanasam taluk of Thanjavur district, Tamil Nadu, India.

Demographics 

As per the 2001 census, Sathiyamangalam had a total population of 3125 with 1530 males and 1595 females. The sex ratio was 1042. The literacy rate was 56.47.

References 

 

Villages in Thanjavur district